Oswald Myconius (1488, Lucerne – 14 October 1552, Basel) was Swiss Protestant theologian and Protestant reformer.  He was a follower of Huldrych Zwingli.

Life
He was born at Lucerne, Switzerland. His family name was Geisshüsler, and his father was a miller; hence he was also called Molitoris (Latin molitor, "miller"). The name Myconius is said to have been given him by Erasmus; it alludes to the proverbial expression bald-headed Myconian. From the school at Lucerne he went to the University of Basel to study classics. From 1514 he obtained teaching posts at Basel, where he married, and made the acquaintance of Erasmus and of Hans Holbein, the painter. In 1516 he was called, as schoolmaster, to Zürich, where (1518) he attached himself to the reforming party of Zwingli. This led to his being transferred to Lucerne and again, in 1523, reinstated at Zürich.

On the death of Zwingli (1531) he moved to Basel, where he held the office of town's preacher, and (till 1541) the chair of New Testament exegesis. In 1534 he authored the Confession of Basel. In confessional matters he was for a union of all Protestants.  Although a Zwinglian, his readiness to compromise with the advocates of consubstantiation gave him trouble with the hard-line Zwinglians. He had, however, a distinguished follower in Theodore Bibliander.

Works
Among his several tractates, the most important is De H Zwinglii vita et obitu (1536), translated into English by Henry Bennet (1561).

References

Further reading
Melchior Adam, Vita theologorum (1620) 
M. Kirchhofer, O. Myconius (1813) 
Karl Rudolf Hagenbach, J. Oekolampad und O. Myconius (1859) 
F. M. Ledderhose, in Allgemeine deutsche Biog (1886) 
B. Riggenbach and Egli, in Hauck's Realencyklopadie (1903)

1488 births
1552 deaths
16th-century Swiss people
Swiss Calvinist and Reformed theologians
16th-century Calvinist and Reformed theologians